Andorinha (Portuguese meaning swallow) may refer to:

Andorinha, a municipality in the state of Bahia, Brazil
CF Andorinha, a football club in Funchal, Madeira Islands
Andorinha (São Domingos), a football club based in the city of São Domingos, Cape Verde
Andorinha Sport Club, a football club in São Tomé and Príncipe
Empresa de Transportes Andorinha, a Brazilian transport company